The Dr. Reuben Chase House is a historic house located in Bothell, Washington, United States, listed on the National Register of Historic Places. Built in 1885 in a small settlement along the Sammamish River known as Stringtown, It was occupied by Bothell's first doctor, Reuben Chase starting in 1889 and served as his residence, office and the city's first hospital. Still in its original location, the house was fully restored in 2001 and is now part of the University of Washington Bothell campus, housing the Commuter Services office for the college.

See also
 National Register of Historic Places listings in King County, Washington

References

1885 establishments in Washington Territory
Buildings and structures in Bothell, Washington
Houses completed in 1885
Houses in King County, Washington
Houses on the National Register of Historic Places in Washington (state)
National Register of Historic Places in King County, Washington